Amar profundo is a Chilean telenovela created by Jonathan Cuchacovich for Mega. It aired from November 23, 2021 to August 24, 2022. The telenovela follows the Contreras Family, a group of women who must take over their late father's artisanal fishing business in order to get out of debt.

It stars María Gracia Omegna, Nicolás Oyarzún, Josefina Montané, Pedro Campos, and Elisa Zulueta.

Plot 
After the death of her father, Tamara Contreras (María Gracia Omegna) returns to her hometown to pay off a debt that could leave her family out on the street. With the help of her mother and sisters, Tamara takes over her late father's artisanal fishing business, being questioned by the prejudiced men who worked for him and by the president of the fishing union, Fabián Bravo (Nicolás Oyarzún), who happens to be the creditor of the debt.

Cast 
 María Gracia Omegna as Tamara Contreras Solís
 Nicolás Oyarzún as Fabián Bravo
 Josefina Montané as Marina Chamorro
 Pedro Campos as Eric Neira
 Elisa Zulueta as Marlen Marambio
 Jorge Arecheta como Ignacio Goycolea
 Carmen Disa Gutiérrez as Elvira Solís
 Magdalena Müller as Ramona Contreras Solís
 Paula Luchsinger as Jeimy Contreras Solís
 Fernando Godoy as Danilo Chaparro
 Dayana Amigo as Gema Mardones
 Loreto Valenzuela as Abigail Mardones
 Otilio Castro as Jeremías Bravo
 Carolina Arredondo as Begoña 
 José Antonio Raffo as Lizardo Gaete
 Soledad Cruz as Marisol Mardones
 Max Salgado as Oliver Parra
 Andrés Olea as Rollizo
 Octavia Bernasconi as Rafaela Bravo
 Diego Rojas as Gaspar Neira
 Amanda Silva as Celeste Goycolea Contreras

Production 
Filming of Amar profundo began in September 2021 and concluded on March 16, 2022.

Reception

Ratings

Awards and nominations

References

External links 
 

2021 telenovelas
2021 Chilean television series debuts
2022 Chilean television series endings
Chilean telenovelas
Mega (Chilean TV channel) telenovelas
Spanish-language telenovelas